Faculty of Humanities and Social Sciences or the Faculty of Philosophy in Zagreb (Croatian: Filozofski fakultet Sveučilišta u Zagrebu) is one of the faculties of the University of Zagreb.

History
The Faculty of Philosophy is the oldest faculty of the University of Zagreb, which dates its founding to 1669. Philosophy and humanities were taught at the university from the very beginning, while a separate faculty first came into existence in 1776 when the university was divided into Faculties of Philosophy, Theology and Law.

In 1874 the modern University of Zagreb was officially established, with four faculties: Law, Theology, Philosophy and Medicine. The Faculty of Philosophy was called the Mudroslovni fakultet and had the following Chairs:
 Philosophy
 History
 Croatian history
 Slav philology
 Classical philology - Latin
 Classical philology - Greek

The Faculty also served as the general scientific faculty, and since 1876 it taught geology, botany, physics, mathematics, and chemistry; since 1877 zoology; since 1882 pharmacy; since 1883 geography.

In 1893, the Chair of Pedagogy was instituted. The Study of Archeology started in 1893. The Chair of German Philology was created in 1895. The Chair of Indo-Germanology was created in 1908, transformed into the Study of Indology in 1962. The Seminar on Romance Philology first started in 1920. The Chair of Ethnology was created in 1924/1927. The Art History Seminar was created in 1928. The Chair of Psychology was created in 1929. The English Seminar was created in 1935.

Mathematics, pharmacy and other sciences started to split off in several stages, with the creation of separate mathematics and pharmaceutical departments in 1928, when the faculty was renamed into its current name Filozofski fakultet, and the splitting off of individual departments into separate faculties in 1942, 1946 and finally in 1963.

The Institute of Phonetics was founded in 1954. The Chair of General Linguistics and Comparative Literature was created in 1956. The Chair of Sociology was created in 1963 (the Faculty of Law had one since 1906). The Study of Swedish started in 1985. In 1989, the Institute for Information Sciences was founded. In 1994, the Study of Hungarology started.

In 2009, the faculty was occupied by students who demanded free education. The peaceful occupation started on April 20, 2009, and ended on May 24. The second occupation started on November 23, 2009, and ended nearly two weeks later.

Current organization
There are two models of study programs: single major (all courses belong to one program) and double majors (student studies in two equally important programs for equal degrees in both):
 Single major programs are Archaeology, Psychology, Philosophy, Sociology, Pedagogy, Information Science, History, Comparative literature, Italian language and literature, and Croatian language and literature.
 Double major programs are Philosophy, Archaeology, History, Art History, Sociology, Ethnology and Cultural Anthropology, Comparative literature, Croatian language and literature, Pedagogy, Linguistics, Phonetics and languages and literature (English, French, German, Dutch studies, Hungarian, Italian, Portuguese, Romanian, Spanish, Swedish, Classic Philology (Greek and Latin), Turkish, Indology, East, West and South Slavic languages).

The faculty has more than 700 employees, with more than 500 academic staff as well as more than 600 part-time lecturers.

Departments
The Faculty consists of following departments:
Department of English studies
Chair of Scandinavian studies
Department of archeology
Department of ethnology and cultural anthropology
Department of philosophy
Department of phonetics
Department of German studies
Department of information and communication sciences
Department of classical philology
Department of comparative literature
Department of Croatian studies
Department of linguistics
Department of indology and Far East studies
Chair of indology
Chair of sinology
Chair of Japanese studies
Department of turkology and Hungarian studies
Chair of turkology
Chair of Hungarian studies
Department of pedagogy
Department of history
Department of history of art
Department of psychology
Department of Romanic studies
Department of East Slavic languages and literatures
Department of South Slavic languages and literatures
Department of West Slavic languages and literatures
Department of sociology
Department of Italian studies
Chair of anthropology
Chair of Physical education

Library

The Faculty Library moved into a new building opened in March 2009, becoming the second largest library in Croatia (after the nearby National and University Library in Zagreb). It includes 24 department libraries with more than 600 000 books. The library consists of the ground floor, 6 upper floors and a closed repository. The ground floor is mainly intended to be used for reading and writing, while the five upper floors contain books from all departments.

, the sixth floor does not function yet. Books which have not been processed yet and are not available for public use are stored in the closed repository, located in the basement.

There are 750 working places and 250 computers available for use. The library is open to all students and employees of the Faculty for borrowing books, while members of the public may use books and other resources within the library building.
All members and library employees use Koha – a library software which has several interfaces depending on the type of user. The catalogue is open access. It is possible to search for particular books by title, author, ISBN, subject, publisher and call number.

The entire library system is highly technically advanced and equipped with models for supply, catalogization, public borrowing and statistics. One of the main advantages of the library is the 3M RFID system of electronic chips, which enables self-check, allowing users to borrow books by themselves.

2016 riots 

During 2016, many students and professors became dissatisfied with the current dean, prof. dr. sc. Vlatko Previšić (specifically his organization of the university). Previšić planned to connect Faculty of Humanities and Social Sciences (famous for its many agnostic and atheist students) with Catholic Faculty of Theology, offering a double major in Theology and another field of the students' choice.

Students at the Faculty of Humanities protested against this, claiming they do not want to be associated with a religious institution. They started posting memes of the dean Previšić online, as well as putting them up at various locations across the university (such as public halls, library, and the toilet). The dean responded by hiring personal security guards. Many Croatian universities, institutions and charities also offered their support to the protesting students.

Notable faculty and alumni 
 Nadežda Čačinovič (b. 1947)
 Zlatko Crnković (1931–2013)
 Vesna Girardi-Jurkić (1944–2012)
 Albert Goldstein (1943–2007), intellectual, writer, publisher, poet and translator
 Kolinda Grabar-Kitarović (b. 1968), fourth President of Croatia
 Mirela Holy (b. 1971), politician
 Tvrtko Jakovina (b. 1972), historian
 Hrvoje Klasić (b. 1972), historian
 Julijana Matanović (b. 1959)
 Predrag Matvejević (1932–2017), writer and scholar
 Ante Peterlić (1936–2007)
 Nenad Puhovski (b. 1949)
 Žarko Puhovski (b. 1946)
 Milorad Pupovac (b. 1955), linguist and politician
 Vesna Pusić (b. 1953), sociologist and politician
 Nino Raspudić (b. 1975)
 Zvonimir Richtmann (1901–1941), physicist, philosopher, and publicist
 Milivoj Solar (b. 1936)
 Tom Sunic (b. 1953), university professor
 Milena Žic-Fuchs (b. 1954)

References

External links
 Homepage
 Alumni

Humanities
Educational institutions established in the 1690s
1874 establishments in Austria-Hungary